National Law School of Delhi, established in 2008 by Act 1 of 2008 of National Capital Territory of Delhi, is a law university in India.  Vision of the university is to create a premier global legal institute which would compete with the best within and outside India, with a view to imparting knowledge of various aspects of law to the youngsters and introduce them to wide range of opportunities in legal profession around the globe.  The state of art infrastructure of university with all facilities for learning and research in law is at Sector 14, Dwarka, New Delhi.

External links
 Official entry portal of the National Law University, Delhi

Law schools in Delhi